The 2022 Coventry City Council election took place on 5 May 2022. One third of councillors — 18 out of 54 — on Coventry City Council were elected. The election took place alongside other local elections across the United Kingdom.

In the previous council election in 2021, Labour maintained its control of the council, holding 39 seats after the election. The Conservative Party held the remaining 15 seats.

Background

History 

The Local Government Act 1972 created a two-tier system of metropolitan counties and districts covering Greater Manchester, Merseyside, South Yorkshire, Tyne and Wear, the West Midlands, and West Yorkshire starting in 1974. Coventry was a district of the West Midlands metropolitan county. The Local Government Act 1985 abolished the metropolitan counties, with metropolitan districts taking on most of their powers as metropolitan boroughs. The West Midlands Combined Authority was created in 2016 and began electing the mayor of the West Midlands from 2017, which was given strategic powers covering a region coterminous with the former West Midlands metropolitan county.

Coventry Council has variously been under Labour control, Conservative control and no overall control since it was established. Labour most recently gained control of the council in the 2010 election, when they gained six seats at the expense of the Conservatives and Socialist Alternative. Labour continued to make gains to consolidate its majority on the council in the 2011 and 2012 elections, since when the party's position has remained stable. In the 2021 Coventry City Council election, Labour won 13 of the seats up for election with 43.6% of the vote, while the Conservatives won the remaining six with 33.4% of the vote. The Green Party received 8.6% of the vote but won no seats. Labour maintained its majority on the council.

Positions up for election in 2022 were last elected in 2018. In that election, Labour won thirteen seats and the Conservatives won five seats.

Electoral process 

The council elects its councillors in thirds, with a third being up for election every year for three years, with no election in the fourth year. The election will take place by first-past-the-post voting, with wards being represented by three councillors, with one councillor elected in each ward each election year to serve a four-year term.

All registered electors (British, Irish, Commonwealth and European Union citizens) living in Coventry aged 18 or over will be entitled to vote in the election. People who live at two addresses in different councils, such as university students with different term-time and holiday addresses, are entitled to be registered for and vote in elections in both local authorities. Voting in-person at polling stations will take place from 07:00 to 22:00 on election day, and voters will be able to apply for postal votes or proxy votes in advance of the election. People voting in this election in Coventry only vote for a councillor in the ward they reside.

Previous council composition

Results summary

Wards

Bablake

Binley and Willenhall

Cheylesmore

Earlsdon

Foleshill

Henley

Holbrook

Longford

Lower Stoke

Radford

Sherbourne

St. Michaels

Upper Stoke

Wainbody

Westwood

Whoberley

Woodlands

Wyken

References 

Coventry City Council elections
Coventry